Lord Charles Henry Somerset PC (12 December 1767 – 18 February 1831), born in Badminton, England, was a British soldier, politician and colonial administrator. He was governor of the Cape Colony, South Africa, from 1814 to 1826.

Background
Somerset was the second son of Henry Somerset, 5th Duke of Beaufort, and Elizabeth, daughter of Admiral the Hon. Edward Boscawen. He was the brother of Henry Somerset, 6th Duke of Beaufort, General Lord Robert Somerset, Lord Arthur Somerset and Field Marshal FitzRoy Somerset, 1st Baron Raglan.

Political career
Somerset sat as member of parliament for Scarborough between 1796 and 1802 and for Monmouth Boroughs between 1802 and 1813. He served as Comptroller of the Household between 1797 and 1804 and as Joint Paymaster of the Forces between 1804 and 1806 and 1807 and 1813 and was sworn of the Privy Council on 26 April 1797. In 1814 he was appointed Governor of the Cape Colony, a post he held until 1826. The towns of Somerset West and Somerset East in South Africa are named after him.

Family
Somerset married firstly Lady Elizabeth Courtenay (2 September 1788 – 11 September 1815), on 7 June 1788, following their elopement. She was the daughter of the 8th Earl of Devon. They had six children:

Elizabeth Somerset (October 1790 – 1872), married General the Hon. Sir Henry Wyndham (1790–1860) in July 1812
Mary Georgiana Somerset (February 1793 – 19 May 1856), married Lt-Col. Stirling Freeman Glover on 25 June 1833
Lieutenant-General Sir Henry Somerset (1794–1862)
Charlotte Augusta Somerset (2 January 1799 – 17 March 1864), married Herbert Cornewoll in May 1822
Lieutenant-Colonel Charles Henry Somerset (24 September 1800 – 28 May 1835)
Reverend Villiers Somerset (12 February 1803 – 3 February 1855), married Frances Dorothy Ley on 8 August 1844 and had issue

After the death of Lady Elizabeth, he married secondly Lady Mary Poulett, daughter of the 4th Earl Poulett, on 9 August 1821. They had three children:

Colonel Poulett Somerset (1822–1875)
Mary Sophia Somerset (20 May 1823 – 11 November 1869)
Augusta Anne Somerset (21 April 1824 – 27 December 1881), married Sir Henry Barron, 1st Baronet on 1 August 1863.

Somerset died in February 1831, aged 63. His second wife died in June 1860, aged 72.

Ancestry

Matthew Bryn Volker

Biographies

References

External links 
 

https://isbndb.com/book/9780196370774

1767 births
1831 deaths
Younger sons of dukes
Members of the Parliament of Great Britain for English constituencies
British MPs 1796–1800
Members of the Parliament of the United Kingdom for Welsh constituencies
UK MPs 1801–1802
UK MPs 1802–1806
UK MPs 1806–1807
UK MPs 1807–1812
UK MPs 1812–1818
Members of the Privy Council of the United Kingdom
Paymasters of the Forces
Governors of the Cape Colony
C
People from Badminton, Gloucestershire